Phyllachora leveilleana is a species of fungus, a member of the division Ascomycota, and was first described by Ferdinand Theissen and Hans Sydow in 1917. Phyllachora leveilleana belongs to the genus Phyllachora, and family Phyllachoraceae.

References 

Phyllachorales
Taxa named by Ferdinand Theissen
Taxa named by Hans Sydow
Fungi described in 1917